Capuli may refer to:
 The Pre-Columbian Capulí culture
 The Capulin cherry